The People's Liberation Army Macao Garrison is a garrison of the People's Liberation Army (PLA), responsible for defense duties in the Macau Special Administrative Region (SAR) since the sovereignty of Macau was transferred to China in 1999.

The PLA stations between 500 and 600 troops in Macau, primarily as a symbolic presence to underscore Chinese sovereignty. The remainder of the 1,200-strong Macau garrison resides just across the Chinese border in Zhuhai.

Although the Macao Basic Law states that the Macau SAR government may "when necessary" ask the central government to allow the garrison to assist in maintaining public order or disaster relief, Chief Executive Edmund Ho has said that, in keeping with the Basic Law the garrison will play no role in internal security. The garrison has maintained a low profile, with soldiers generally wearing civilian clothing when off base and not engaging in business activities.

Mission 
According to the Law on Stationing Troops in the Macau Special Administrative Region (or Macao Garrison Law, passed by the NPC Standing Committee on June 28, 1999), the mission of the PLA in Macau is to defend the special administrative region by "preventing and resisting aggression; safe-guarding the security of Macau; undertaking defense services; managing military facilities; and handling related foreign military affairs." The PLA can also be called upon by the chief executive to help maintain public order and assist with disaster relief efforts. The members of the garrison are mainly ground force troops.

2017 Typhoon Hato

At the request of Macau SAR Government, the PLA Macao Garrison was deployed to assist in disaster relief and cleaning up in the aftermath of Typhoon Hato in August 2017, the first time for domestic affairs in Macau history. About 1,000 troops were called in to help remove debris and clear roads.

Organization

The PLA Macao Garrison is under the command and control of the Central Military Commission and under the operational supervision of the Southern Theater Command, and its budget is administered by the central government in Beijing. A PLA major general heads the Macao Garrison.

 Garrison Commanders
 Maj. General Liu Yuejun 1999–2002
 Maj. General Liu Lianhua 2002–2008
 Maj. General Wang Yuren 2008–2010
 Maj. General Zhu Qingsheng 2010–2014
 Maj. General Wang Wen 2014–2018
 Maj. General Liao Zhengrong 2018
 Maj. General Xu Liangcai 2019–present

 Political Commissars
 Maj. General He Xianshu 1999–2001
 Maj. General Liu Liangkai 2001–2003
 Maj. General Yang Zhongmin 2003–2006
 Maj. General Li Wenchao 2006–2007
 Maj. General Zhao Cunsheng 2007–2008
 Maj. General Xu Jinlin 2008–2013
 Maj. General Ma Biqiang 2013–2014
 Maj. General Zhang Zhimeng 2014–2017
 Maj. General Zhou Wugang 2017–present

Troops
 1 motorized infantry
 1 armoured company

Equipment

Bases
The garrison was temporarily stationed at the 11 storey Edificação Long Cheng/Long Cheng Mansion. It is now stationed on Taipa located amongst the new casinos in Cotai (Estrada da Baía de Nossa Sra. da Esperança across from Hotel Venetian and Galaxy Macau).

There are more troops at the barracks in Zhuhai (Zhengling).

See also 

 Military of Macau under Portuguese rule
 Hong Kong Garrison

Notes

References

External links 
 

People's Liberation Army Ground Force
Military in Macau
Southern Theater Command
1999 establishments in Macau
Military units and formations established in 1999